Jomo Harris (born 15 February 1995) is a Barbadian international footballer who plays for Kemi Kings, as a midfielder.

Career
Born in Eden Lodge, he has played club football for Paradise and UWI Blackbirds, and college soccer in the United States for Arizona Western College. In December 2015 he was one of two Barbadian players (alongside Romario Harewood) to be selected for the MLS Caribbean Combine in Martinique.

He made his international debut for Barbados in 2015.

In April 2019, Jomo joined Finnish club Palloseura Kemi Kings.

References

1995 births
Living people
Barbadian footballers
Barbados international footballers
Paradise FC (Barbados) players
UWI Blackbirds FC players
Kemi City F.C. players
Association football midfielders
Barbadian expatriate footballers
Barbadian expatriates in the United States
Expatriate soccer players in the United States